Vueltas, or Las Vueltas, may refer to some places:

Vueltas (officially San Antonio de las Vueltas), a village in Villa Clara Province, Cuba
Las Vueltas, a municipality in Chalatenango Department, El Salvador
Vueltas (hill), a hill in Parácuaro Municipality, Michoacán, Mexico

See also
Vuelta (disambiguation)